The William Murphy House is a historic house located in Brookline, Massachusetts.

Description and history 
This -story wood-frame house was built in 1886 by Waldo Stearns, and is a well-preserved local example of a Queen Anne Victorian. It was purchased in 1930 by Doctor William Parry Murphy, who shared the 1934 Nobel Prize in Physiology or Medicine for discovering a cure for pernicious anemia. (The home of one of Murphy's corecipients, Dr. George Minot, is also located in Brookline, and is a National Historic Landmark.)

The house was listed on the National Register of Historic Places on October 17, 1985.

See also
National Register of Historic Places listings in Brookline, Massachusetts

References

Houses in Brookline, Massachusetts
National Register of Historic Places in Brookline, Massachusetts
Houses on the National Register of Historic Places in Norfolk County, Massachusetts
Queen Anne architecture in Massachusetts
Houses completed in 1886